Three ships of the Royal Navy have borne the name HMS Persian:

  was a  launched in 1809 and wrecked in 1813.
  was an  launched in 1839 and broken up in 1866.
  was a  launched in 1890 and shortly afterwards before completion renamed HMS Wallaroo. In 1919 she was further renamed HMS Wallington and sold for scrap in 1920.

Royal Navy ship names